Daniel Edgar may refer to:

Daniel Edgar (musician)
Dan Edgar, participant in reality show, The Only Way Is Essex
Daniel Edgar, mayor of Palca District, Tarma